"Rise of the Machines" is a single by hip hop group Jedi Mind Tricks (JMT), released as a limited edition promo single in 2003 . The vinyl is the only JMT single not to feature a B-Side. The album version of Rise of the Machines features a Latin acoustic guitar sample, coupled with clips from Mike Tyson's infamous "I wanna eat your children" speech. The song, named after the film Terminator 3: Rise of the Machines, features revered West Coast lyricist Ras Kass, who was imprisoned at the time of the release. The song features a previously recorded verse from the rapper. JMT vocalist Vinnie Paz joined in on the "Free Ras Kass" campaign, saying the phrase on the track, and wearing the "Free Ras Kass" shirt on the Visions of Gandhi tour.

However, the remix (vinyl single version, shown in the picture) features a sample of Evanescence's hit song, Bring Me to Life. For some reason, this version was never really recognized, except by DJs who used the instrumental for their mixes. It features all of the same vocals of the album version, but the chorus sample has been replaced by the intro vocals from Bring Me to Life. It is also criticized for being mixed slightly offbeat, compared to the album version. This is noticeable if you line the two versions up and listen closely.

"Rise of the Machines" was the third and final single released from JMT's third album Visions of Gandhi, following 2002's "Animal Rap" and 2003's "Kublai Khan".

Track listing

A-Side
"Rise of the Machines" (Clean Version) (feat. Evanescence & Ras Kass)
"Rise of the Machines" (Dirty Version) (feat. Evanescence & Ras Kass)
"Rise of the Machines" (Instrumental)

2003 singles
2003 songs
Jedi Mind Tricks songs